Recorded "Live" at Basin Street East is an album by the jazz vocalese group Lambert, Hendricks & Bavan recorded at the New York City nightclub Basin Street East. The album features the group who had re-formed in 1963 featuring Dave Lambert and Jon Hendricks, with Yolande Bavan replacing Annie Ross who had left the group in 1962.

Reception

Scott Yanow, writing on AllMusic said of the album that "This recording finds Jon Hendricks and Dave Lambert in prime form, with Bavan doing her best to fit in (her accent does stand out, although her singing skills are impressive) ...The highlights include a classic rendition of "Doodlin'," John Coltrane's "Cousin Mary," Hendricks' humorous "Feed Me" and "Dis Hyunh" (really "This Here"). An entertaining performance overall, recorded during a three-day period."

Track listing 
 "This Could Be the Start of Something" (Steve Allen) - 3:08
 "Shiny Stockings" (Frank Foster, Jon Hendricks) - 4:37
 "Slightly Out of Tune (Desafinado)" (Antonio Carlos Jobim, Newton Mendonça, Hendricks) - 2:24
 "Doodlin'" (Horace Silver, Hendricks) - 3:30
 "Cousin Mary" (John Coltrane, Hendricks) - 3:43
 "April in Paris" (Vernon Duke, E.Y. "Yip" Harburg, Hendricks) - 4:20
 "Feed Me" (Hendricks) - 2:38
 "One Note Samba" (Jobim, Mendonça, Hendricks) - 2:59
 "Melba's Blues" (Hendricks) - 4:09
 "This Here" (Bobby Timmons, Hendricks) - 3:29
 "Swingin' Till the Girls Come Home" (Hendricks) - 5:46

Personnel
Dave Lambert, Jon Hendricks, Yolande Bavan  – vocals

References 

 

1963 live albums
Albums produced by George Avakian
Albums recorded at Basin Street East
Lambert, Hendricks & Ross albums
RCA Records live albums
Live vocal jazz albums